A saga novel is a genre encompassing the wide scopes of stories and narratives such as religious saga, national saga, family saga, human saga, etc.

History

Icelandic Tradition 
The saga novel as a genre originates from the Icelandic history of family sagas

Examples
A major example of a saga novel in English literature is George Eliot's Middlemarch. In Russia, Leo Tolstoy's War and Peace is a representative saga novel. In Korea, Kyunglee Park's Lands (Tohgee) is another example. In the United States, Pearl S. Buck's The Good Earth and Margaret Mitchell's Gone with the Wind belong to the category of saga novels. In China, Lo Guanzhong (Lo Kuanchung)'s Sanguo zhi yanyi (Sankuo chi yen-i; Romance of the Three Kingdoms) is the most representative and well-known saga novel since the 14th century.

References

Novel forms